Japanese telephone carriers may refer to:

 Communications in Japan § Telephone services
 Mobile phone industry in Japan § Providers
 List of telephone operating companies § Japan
 List of mobile network operators of the Asia Pacific region § Japan

See also 
 Telephone numbers in Japan